The  Tabar pitta (Erythropitta splendida) is a species of the pitta bird. It was considered a subspecies of the Bismarck pitta, and some taxonomic authorities still consider it so. It is endemic to the Tabar Group in Papua New Guinea. Its natural habitat is subtropical or tropical moist lowland forests.  It is threatened by habitat loss.

References

Tabar pitta
Birds of the Bismarck Archipelago
Tabar pitta